Henry Washington Hilliard (August 4, 1808 – December 17, 1892) was a unionist U.S. Representative from Alabama and a general in the Confederate States Army during the American Civil War. In later life, he became a proponent of abolitionism in Brazil.

Early life
Hilliard was born in Fayetteville, North Carolina, and graduated from South Carolina College (now the University of South Carolina) at Columbia in 1826. While at South Carolina College, he was active in the Euphradian Society.
He studied law and moved to Athens, Georgia, where he was admitted to the bar in 1829.
He was a professor at the University of Alabama from 1831 to 1834, when he resigned to practice law in Montgomery, Alabama.

He served as member of the state house of representatives in 1836–1838, as member of the Whig National Convention at Harrisburg, Pennsylvania, in 1839, Whig presidential elector in 1840 and was an unsuccessful candidate for election to the Twenty-seventh Congress in 1840.
He was chargé d'affaires to Belgium from May 12, 1842, to August 12, 1844.
Hilliard was elected as a Whig to the Twenty-ninth, Thirtieth, and Thirty-first Congresses (March 4, 1845 – March 3, 1851) but he was not a candidate for renomination in 1850.

In 1856, he served as presidential elector on the National American ticket.

Civil War service
In 1861 he was appointed by Jefferson Davis Confederate commissioner to Tennessee.  During the Civil War, he served as a colonel in the Confederate States Army.

Hilliard's Legion was organized at Montgomery, Alabama in June, 1862, and consisted of five battalions; one of these, a mounted battalion, was early detached and became part of the Tenth Confederate cavalry. The Legion proceeded to Montgomery nearly 3,000 strong, under the command of Col. H. W. Hilliard, and was placed in McCown's Brigade. It took part in the siege of Cumberland Gap, and spent the fall and winter in Kentucky and east Tennessee.

Hilliard resigned from the army December 1, 1862 to take care of personal affairs and because he had not been promoted to brigadier general.

Postbellum
He moved to Augusta, Georgia, in 1865 and resumed the practice of his profession.
He was an unsuccessful Republican candidate for election in 1876 to the Forty-fifth Congress.

He resumed the practice of law in Augusta, Georgia, moving later to Atlanta.
He was Envoy Extraordinary and Minister Plenipotentiary to Brazil from July 31, 1877, to June 15, 1881. In Brazil he worked with  Joaquim Nabuco and Emperor Pedro II to support abolition.

He died in Atlanta, Georgia, December 17, 1892 and was interred in Oakwood Cemetery, Montgomery, Alabama.

Notes

References
 Allardice, Bruce S. Confederate Colonels: A Biographical Register. Columbia: University of Missouri Press, 2008. .
 Retrieved on 2009-04-16

 Durham, David R. (2008). A Southern Moderate in Radical Times: Henry Washington Hilliard, 1808–1892. Louisiana State University Press. 
 Evans, Clement A. ed., Confederate Military History, Vol. VII, p. 234, Confederate Pub. Co., Atlanta, 1899.
 Hilliard, Henry Washington. Politics and Pen Pictures at Home and Abroad G.P. Putnam's Sons, 1892.

External links

 Hilliard's Legion Ohio State University

1808 births
1892 deaths
Politicians from Fayetteville, North Carolina
Georgia (U.S. state) Republicans
Ambassadors of the United States to Belgium
Ambassadors of the United States to Brazil
University of South Carolina alumni
Georgia (U.S. state) lawyers
People of North Carolina in the American Civil War
Confederate States Army officers
19th-century American diplomats
Alabama Know Nothings
Whig Party members of the United States House of Representatives from Alabama
19th-century American politicians
19th-century American lawyers